Continental Divide: Heidegger, Cassirer, Davos is a 2010 book by Peter Gordon, in which the author reconstructs the famous 1929 debate between Martin Heidegger and Ernst Cassirer at Davos, Switzerland, demonstrating its significance as a point of rupture in Continental thought that implicated all the major philosophical movements of the day. Continental Divide was awarded the Jacques Barzun Prize from the American Philosophical Society in 2010.

References

External links 
 Continental Divide: Heidegger, Cassirer, Davos

2010 non-fiction books
Continental philosophy literature
English-language books
Ernst Cassirer
Harvard University Press books
Works about Martin Heidegger